Stow Bedon  is village and former civil parish, now in the parish of Stow Bedon and Breckles, in the Breckland district of the English county of Norfolk. Stow Bedon adjoins the hamlet of Lower Stow Bedon, although the two are often considered to be one village. In the south of the parish is the village of Breckles. In 2011 the merged parish had a population of 290.

The villages name means 'Place'. The village was held by John di Bidun in the 13th century.

The Domesday Book mentions both Stow Bedon (together with Caston) and Breckles. The Inclosure Act mentions Stow Bedon as a 'Free Village' and mentions how the village "maintained an independent spirit". Further records show that during Queen Victoria's Jubilee, instead of the traditional roasting of an ox, Stow Bedon only roasted a pig.

Kelly's Directory for 1883 records that Stow Bedon had a population of 324 with a total of 35 dwellings. It has been assumed in recent times, however, that the true number of houses during this period would have been greater.

The village church dates from the 14th century and is dedicated to St Botolph; it is a Grade II* listed building. The south and west of the area is a separate ecclesiastical parish, and its church, St Margaret's at Breckles, is Grade I listed.

A station at Stow Bedon, on the Thetford & Watton Railway, opened in October 1869 and closed with the line in June 1964. The Great Eastern Pingo Trail, a 13-kilometre circular walk, starts and finishes in the village. Parking is on the A1075, in the former railway station yard. The village fete is held annually in June, and St Botolph's church holds a flower festival.

Stow Bedon is closely connected to the towns of Watton, Attleborough and Thetford.

Governance 
On 1 April 1935 the parish of Breckles was merged with Stow Bedon. The merged parish is now called "Stow Bedon and Breckles". In 1931 the parish (prior to the merge) had a population of 245.

References

http://kepn.nottingham.ac.uk/map/place/Norfolk/Stow%20Bedon

Villages in Norfolk
Former civil parishes in Norfolk
Breckland District